Donald Paschal (December 21, 1920 - November 23, 2000) was a Tennessee Walking Horse trainer who won two World Grand Championships.

Life and career
Paschal lived in Readyville, Tennessee.
In 1968, Paschal rode Go Boy's Royal Heir to the World Grand Championship in the Tennessee Walking Horse National Celebration.
In 1971, he won the Championship in the National Walking Horse Trainers' Show with Handshaker's Delight. The same year, Handshaker's Delight was Reserve World Grand Champion in the Celebration. In 1972, Handshaker's Delight and Paschal won the World Grand Championship. Paschal's brother Sam Paschal was also a Tennessee Walking Horse trainer who won three World Grand Championships. Paschal died on November 23, 2000 at the age of 70.

References

Tennessee Walking Horse breeders and trainers
2000 deaths
1920 births
People from Cannon County, Tennessee